The 2021 season for  was the 42nd season in the team's existence and the 11th season under the current name. The team has been a UCI WorldTeam since 2005, when the tier was first established.

Team roster 

Riders who joined the team for the 2021 season

Riders who left the team during or after the 2020 season

Season victories

National, Continental, and World Champions

Notes

References

External links 

 

Movistar men
2021
Movistar men